Marion Rösiger is a sprint canoer who competed in the late 1970s representing East Germany. She won six medals at the ICF Canoe Sprint World Championships with four golds (K-2 500 m: 1977, 1978; K-4 500 m: 1978, 1979) and two silvers (K-2 500 m: 1979, K-4 500 m: 1977).

References

East German female canoeists
Living people
Year of birth missing (living people)
ICF Canoe Sprint World Championships medalists in kayak